The Lucia Mar Unified School District (LMUSD) is the largest school district in San Luis Obispo County, with about 10,700 students. This territory encompasses the communities of Shell Beach, Pismo Beach, Grover Beach, Arroyo Grande, Oceano, Halcyon, and Nipomo.

School changes

Central Coast New Tech High School opened in 2012 with a freshman class. The school added a freshman class each year, reaching all four classes in the 2015–2016 school year. Two new schools have been built in Nipomo: Nipomo High School in 2002, and Dorothea Lange Elementary in 2006.  A few years earlier, Lopez Continuation High School moved to a new campus on the Nipomo Mesa.  And Arroyo Grande High School underwent a major renovation with new Career Technical Education buildings and facilities, including a new pool, tennis courts and multi-purpose room. The 'Clark Center For The Performing Arts' opened on the Arroyo Grande High School campus in 2002. It is used by all the schools in the district and the community. A new gym was built for Mesa Middle School and a multi-purpose room with covered eating area was constructed at Paulding Middle School.

Schools

High schools 

 Arroyo Grande High School
 Lopez High School
 Nipomo High School
 Central Coast New Tech High School

Middle schools 

 Judkins Middle School
 Paulding Middle School
 Mesa Middle School

Elementary schools 

 Branch Elementary School, K-6, California Distinguished School
 Dana Elementary School, TK-6
 Dorothea Lange Elementary School, TK-6
 Fairgrove Elementary School, TK-6, California Distinguished School
 Grover Beach Elementary School, TK-6 International Baccalaureate World School
 Grover Heights Elementary School, TK-6
 Harloe Elementary School, K-6, opened September 1955, California Distinguished School
 Nipomo Elementary, TK-6
 Ocean View Elementary School, TK-6, California Distinguished School and National Blue Ribbon School
 Oceano Elementary School, TK-6
 Shell Beach Elementary School, TK-6

Independent Study School 
Pacific View Academy, K-12

References

External links 

 

School districts in San Luis Obispo County, California
Education in Arroyo Grande, California